Edward Bennett Mathews, Ph.D., was an American geologist.  He obtained a bachelor's degree from Colby College in 1891, and began serving with the United States Geological Survey in the same year, working under Charles R. Van Hise. He was a Professor of Mineralogy and Petrography at Johns Hopkins University.  He was appointed the Assistant State Geologist of Maryland in 1896 by the State Geologist, William Bullock Clark, and served in that role until 1917, when he became the State Geologist upon Clark's death.  He retired from Johns Hopkins in 1939, departed the position of State Geologist in 1943, and died the following year.

Publications
Miller, B.L., Mathews, E.B., Bibbins, A.B., and Little, H.P., 1917, Tolchester folio, Maryland: U.S. Geological Survey, Geologic Atlas of the United States Folio GF-204, scale 1:125,000.
Mathews, E.B., and Miller, W.J., 1905, Cockeysville Marble (Baltimore County, Maryland): Geological Society of America, Bulletin v.16, scale 1:158,000.
Clark, W.B., Shattuck, G.B., Bascom, Florence, Mathews, E.B., Dorsey, C.W., Bonsteel, J.A., Fassig, O.L., Pressy, H.A., and Curran, H.M., 1902, The physical features of Cecil County (Maryland, accompanied by a County Atlas (1902)): Maryland Geological Survey
Mathews, E.B., 1904, The structure of the Piedmont Plateau as shown in Maryland, American Journal of Science, 4th Series v. 17
Mathews, E.B., Berry, E.W., Knopf, E.B., Jonas, A.I., Watson, E.B., Carter, W.T., Jr., Synder, J.M., Bruce, O.C., Nunn, Roscoe, Bauer, L.A., and Besley, F.W., 1929, The physical features of Baltimore County (Maryland): Maryland Geological Survey
Mathews, E.B., Miller, B.L., Bennett, H.W., Tharp, W.E., Lyman, W.S., Westover, H.L., Nunn, Roscoe, Wood, B.D., Bauer, L.A., and Besley, F.W., 1926, The physical features of Queen Anne's County (Maryland, accompanied by a County Atlas (1916)): Maryland Geological Survey
Mathews, E.B., Miller, B.L., Bennett, H.W., Tharp, W.E., Lyman, W.S., Westover, H.L., Nunn, Roscoe, Wood, B.D., Bauer, L.A., and Besley, F.W., 1926, The physical features of Talbot County (Maryland, accompanied by a County Atlas (1916)): Maryland Geological Survey
Mathews, E.B., Miller, B.L., Bonsteel, J.A., Nunn, Roscoe, Grover, N.C., Bauer, L.A., and Besley, F.W., 1926, The physical features of Kent County (Maryland, accompanied by a County Atlas (1915)): Maryland Geological Survey

References

1869 births
1944 deaths
Colby College alumni
American geologists
Johns Hopkins University faculty
Academics from Portland, Maine